Sir Robert Kitchen (alt. Kytchen) was Alderman of Bristol.  He died on 19 June 1594.  He gifted one of the four bronze 'nails' (merchants' counting tables) to The Exchange in Bristol.

References

1594 deaths
Businesspeople from Bristol
16th-century English nobility